Salvador Sanpere (born 1 November 1938) is a former sports shooter from the United States Virgin Islands. He competed in the 50 metre rifle, three positions event at the 1972 Summer Olympics.

References

1938 births
Living people
United States Virgin Islands male sport shooters
Olympic shooters of the United States Virgin Islands
Shooters at the 1972 Summer Olympics
Place of birth missing (living people)